Umar Mustafa Al-Muntassar  (1939 – 23 January 2001) was Secretary of the General People's Committee (Prime Minister) of the Libyan Arab Jamahiriya from 1 March 1987 to 7 October 1990 and the foreign minister from 13 August 1992 until 16 July 2000. Umar Mustafa died in January 23 2001 of natural causes.

Prime Ministers of Libya
1939 births
2001 deaths
Foreign ministers of Libya
Members of the General People's Committee of Libya